"Moulaga" is a song by French-Algerian rapper Heuss l'Enfoiré featuring vocals from French rapper Jul. It was released in 2019 and peaked at number 2 in France.

Charts

References

2019 singles
2019 songs
French-language songs